Julio César Franco López (born October 1, 1965 in Asunción, Paraguay) is a Paraguayan former footballer who played as a midfielder for clubs in Paraguay, Spain, Argentina and Chile. He was also a member of the Paraguay national team that participated in Copa America 1989.

Teams
 Guaraní 1984-1988
 Cádiz 1988-1989
 Guaraní 1989-1991
 Deportivo Mandiyú 1992-1993
 Guaraní 1993
 Deportes Iquique 1994-1995
 Guaraní 1996-1997
 Silvio Pettirossi 1998
 Independiente 1998-1999
 Silvio Pettirossi 2000

References

External links
 
 

1965 births
Living people
Sportspeople from Asunción
Paraguayan footballers
Association football midfielders
Paraguay international footballers
1989 Copa América players
Club Guaraní players
Cádiz CF players
Deportes Iquique footballers
Club Atlético Independiente footballers
Primera B de Chile players
Argentine Primera División players
Paraguayan expatriate footballers
Paraguayan expatriate sportspeople in Chile
Expatriate footballers in Chile
Paraguayan expatriate sportspeople in Argentina
Expatriate footballers in Argentina
Paraguayan expatriate sportspeople in Spain
Expatriate footballers in Spain